Andorra competed at the 2014 Winter Olympics in Sochi, Russia, from 7 to 23 February 2014. The Andorran team consisted of six athletes in three sports.

Alpine skiing 

According to the final quota allocation released on 20 January 2014, Andorra had five athletes in qualification position. The final team was announced with four athletes, meaning the country decided to reject one of its quota spots.

Biathlon  

Reallocation of quotas, allowed Andorra to enter one female athlete. Laure Soulie was officially announced as a member of the team on 24 January 2014.

Snowboarding 

According to the final quota allocation released on 20 January 2014, Andorra had one athlete in qualification position. The final team was announced on 24 January 2014. Tarroch was disqualified in the round of 39, and thus finished a joint 25th.

Non-qualified sports

Cross-country skiing 

According to the quota allocation released on 20 January 2014, Andorra had one athlete in qualification position. However the final team did not include the qualified athlete, Irineu Esteve Altimiras.

References

External links 
 
 

Nations at the 2014 Winter Olympics
2014
2014 in Andorran sport